This is a list of destinations served by Spanish airline Clickair as of July 2009, before it merged with Vueling:

Africa

Morocco
Casablanca – Mohammed V International Airport
Marrakech – Marrakech-Menara Airport

Europe

Austria
Vienna – Vienna International Airport
Belgium
Brussels – Brussels Airport
Croatia
Dubrovnik – Dubrovnik Airport [seasonal]
Czech Republic
Prague – Ruzyně Airport
France
Paris
Charles de Gaulle Airport
Orly Airport
Germany
Munich – Munich Airport
Greece
Athens – Athens International Airport
Hungary
Budapest – Ferihegy Airport
Italy
Milan - Malpensa Airport
Naples – Naples Airport
Palermo - Palermo Airport
Pisa – Galileo Galilei Airport
Rome – Leonardo da Vinci Airport
Venice – Venice Marco Polo Airport
Verona – Verona Airport
Malta
Luqa – Malta International Airport
Netherlands
Amsterdam – Amsterdam Airport Schiphol
Poland
Warsaw – Warsaw Frederic Chopin Airport
Portugal
Lisbon – Portela Airport
Romania
Bucharest – Henri Coandă International Airport
Russia
Moscow – Domodedovo International Airport
Saint Petersburg – Pulkovo Airport
Spain
A Coruña – A Coruña Airport
Alicante – Alicante Airport
Asturias – Asturias Airport
Barcelona – El Prat Airport (Main Base)
Bilbao – Bilbao Airport
Granada – Federico García Lorca Airport
Ibiza – Ibiza Airport
Málaga – Málaga Airport (base)
Menorca – Menorca Airport
Palma de Mallorca – Palma de Mallorca Airport (base)
Santiago de Compostela – Santiago de Compostela Airport
Seville – San Pablo Airport (base)
Tenerife – Los Rodeos Airport
Valencia – Valencia Airport (base)
Vigo – Peinador Airport
United Kingdom
London – Heathrow Airport

References

Lists of airline destinations